Love Has a Name is the eleventh studio album by Christian singer-songwriter Kathy Troccoli. It was released on October 24, 2000, by Reunion Records. After the releases of her collaboration with fellow Christian singer Sandi Patty on the pop standards album Together and A Sentimental Christmas, both came out in 1999, Troccoli returned to Christian music, that also includes a cover of Foreigner's 1985 number-one hit "I Want to Know What Love Is". Love Has a Name peaked at number 36 on the Top Christian Albums chart and number 43 on the Heatseekers Albums chart in Billboard magazine.

Track listing

Personnel 
 Kathy Troccoli – vocals 
 Kent Hooper – keyboards (1, 2, 4, 8), programming (1, 2, 4, 8)
 Jeff Roach – additional keyboards (1, 2, 4, 8), organ (1, 2, 4, 8)
 Blair Masters – keyboards (3, 6, 9), programming (3, 6, 9)
 Gary Burnette – guitars (1, 2, 4, 8)
 David Cleveland – guitars (1, 2, 4, 8)
 Mark Baldwin – guitars (3, 6, 9)
 Nick Moroch – guitars (5, 7, 10)
 Chris Kent – bass (1, 2, 4, 8)
 Jackie Street – bass (3, 6, 9)
 Steve Brewster – drums (1, 2, 4, 8)
 John Hammond – drums (3, 6, 9), programming (3, 6, 9)
 Ken Lewis – percussion (1, 2, 4, 8)
 Eric Darken – percussion (3, 6, 9)
 Mark Douthit – horns (1)
 Chris McDonald – horns (1)
 Jeff Bailey – horns (1)
 Mike Haynes – horns (1)
 Lisa Cochran – backing vocals (1-4, 6, 9)
 Tim Davis – backing vocals (1, 2, 4)
 Chris Harris – backing vocals (1, 2, 4)
 Marabeth Jordan – backing vocals (1, 2, 4)
 Gary Pigg – backing vocals (1, 8)
 Chance Scoggins – backing vocals (3, 6, 9)
 Terry White – backing vocals (3, 6, 9)
 Issac Clemon – backing vocals (5)
 Dennis Collins – backing vocals (5, 7, 10)
 Kevin Owens – backing vocals (5)
 Fonzi Thornton – backing vocals (5, 7, 10), BGV arrangements and contractor (5, 7, 10)
 Katreese Barnes – backing vocals (7, 10)
 Robin Clark – backing vocals (7)
 Melonie Daniels – backing vocals (7)
 Vaneese Thomas – backing vocals (7)
 Ashley Anderson – backing vocals (8)
 Shannon Bellflower – backing vocals (8)
 Anna Flautt – backing vocals (8)
 Brandon Harris – backing vocals (8)
 Shauntea McClish – backing vocals (8)
 Tiah Mustin – backing vocals (8)
 Todd Mustin – backing vocals (8)
 Gabe Pigg – backing vocals (8)
 Landon Pigg – backing vocals (8)

Choir on "I Want to Know What Love Is"
 Darwin Hobbs, Tiffany Palmer, Angela Primm, Jerard Woods and Jovaun Woods

Production and Technical 
 Matt Baugher – executive producer 
 Dean Diehl – executive producer
 George King – executive producer
 David Hentschel – co-producer (5)
 David Mann – co-producer (7)
 Tom Salta – co-producer (10)
 Kent Hooper – recording (1, 2, 4, 8)
 Todd Robbins – recording (1, 2, 4, 8)
 John Jaszcz – recording (3, 6, 9)
 Mark Baldwin – tracking (3, 6, 9)
 Roy Hendrickson – recording (5, 7), mixing (5, 7)
 Tim Odell – assistant engineer (1, 2, 4, 8)
 Tom Laune – mixing (1, 2, 4, 8)
 Grant Greene – mixing (3, 6, 9)
 Lynn Fuston – mastering (1-4, 6, 8, 9), lead vocal recording (5, 7, 10)
 Vlado Meller – mastering (5, 7, 10)
 3D Audio (Franklin, Tennessee) and Sony Music Studios (New York City, New York) – mastering locations
 Chad Dickerson – A&R 
 Stephanie McBrayer – production coordinator 
 Scott Hughes – art direction 
 Tim Parker – design 
 Russ Harrington – photography

Charts

Radio singles

References 

2000 albums
Kathy Troccoli albums
Reunion Records albums